Dabel is a municipality in the Ludwigslust-Parchim district, in Mecklenburg-Vorpommern, Germany.

Notable people
Ludwig Stubbendorf (1906–1941), horse rider

References

Ludwigslust-Parchim